Delightfully Pleased is the sixth studio album by the pop punk band Punchline which was released on August 10, 2010. It is the follow-up to Just Say Yes, released in 2008. The album's title comes from the lyrics of the song "Into The Mouth". The name of the record was thought of during a dream.

The band also released it as a free download. After an incident following a Brokencyde concert in which members of Brokencyde allegedly attacked Punchline's drummer, Cory Muro, and his friend, leaving him requiring three staples in his head and his friend with a broken nose, a website was launched through which visitors could donate money for Delightfully Pleased, any money raised going towards Muro's medical bills incurred as a result of the incident.

The artwork was by their friend Justin Will.

Track listing

References

Punchline (band) albums
2010 albums